The Hazfi Cup 2001–02 is the 15th staging of Iran's football knockout competition.

Bracket
Teams from same city meet only once

Semi-final

Final

Leg 1

Leg 2

References 

2001
Haz